Eunoe laetmogonensis is a scale worm known from the north-east Atlantic Ocean at depths of about 800 to 2300 m.

Description
Number of segments 37; elytra 15 pairs. Dorsal surface deep blue (becomes dark brown in alcohol). Prostomium anterior margin comprising a pair of acute anterior projections. Lateral antennae inserted ventrally (beneath prostomium and median antenna). Notochaetae about as thick as neurochaetae. Bidentate neurochaetae absent.

Commensalism
E. laetmogonensis is commensal; its host taxon is the sea cucumber,  Laetmogone violacea.

References

Phyllodocida